Ibanda District is a district in the Western Region of Uganda. The town of Ibanda is the site of the district headquarters.

Location
Ibanda District is bordered by Kitagwenda District to the west, Kamwenge District to the north, Kiruhura District to the east, Mbarara District and Buhweju District to the south, and Rubirizi District to the southwest.

Overview
Ibanda District was created on 1 July 2005, by elevating Ibanda County, formerly part of Mbarara District, to full district status.

Ibanda is connected to the national electricity grid with a sub-station  outside Mbarara town. A tarmac road connects via Mbarara to the capital Kampala.

There is one major hospital, Ibanda Hospital, administered by the Roman Catholic Archdiocese of Mbarara. The hospital has an affiliated school for enrolled midwives and nurses.

Population
In 1991, the national population census estimated the district population at 148,000. The 2002 national census estimated the population at 198,700. The population has a calculated annual growth rate of 2.6 percent. The population in 2012 was about 255,500.

Economic activities
Agriculture forms the backbone of the economy of the district. Most of the agriculture is on the subsistence level. The largest farm in the district is the Kiburara Prison Farm, located at Kiburara Prison. The crops grown in the district include the following:

Prominent people
Prominent people from the district include the following:
 Patrick Bitature, businessman, entrepreneur, and industrialist. He is one of the wealthiest people in Uganda. Chairman of Umeme.
Venansius Baryamureeba Ugandan mathematician, computer scientist, academic, and academic administrator. Chancellor of Ibanda University.

See also
 Districts of Uganda

References

External links
 Gold Mining Starts In Ibanda District

 
Ankole sub-region
Districts of Uganda
Western Region, Uganda